The Lakeview School District is a school district in suburban Battle Creek, Michigan, United States. It is part of the Calhoun Intermediate School District.

Schools
Lakeview has four elementary schools, serving students in grades PK-4:
 
Minges Brook
Westlake
Riverside
Prairieview

Lakeview Middle School serves students in grades 5-8. Lakeview High School serves grades 9-12. There is also an alternative high school co-located with the district offices.

Lakeview  High School students can take classes at the Battle Creek Area Mathematics and Science Center and Calhoun Area Career Center.

Athletics
Lakeview High School's Spartans compete in the Southwestern Michigan Athletic Conference. School colors are purple and white. The following Michigan High School Athletic Association (MHSAA) sanctioned sports are offered:

Baseball (boys) 
State champion - 1986, 2000, 2006
Basketball (girls and boys) 
Bowling (girls and boys) 
Competitive cheerleading (girls) 
Cross country (girls and boys) 
Girls state champion - 2002
Football (boys) 
Golf (girls and boys) 
Boys state champion - 1968 (tie), 1987, 1989, 2008, 2013
Lacrosse (boys)
Soccer (girls and boys) 
Softball (girls) 
Swim and dive (girls and boys) 
Boys state champion - 1967 (tie), 2008
Tennis (girls and boys) 
Boys state champion - 1948 (tie)
Track and field (girls and boys) 
Boys state champion - 1953
Volleyball (girls) 
State champion - 1982
Wrestling (boys)

Notable alumni
Nate Huffman, National Basketball Association (NBA) center
Rick Snyder, 48th Governor of Michigan

References

External links

School districts in Michigan
Battle Creek, Michigan
Education in Calhoun County, Michigan